Shiḥna was a medieval Islamic term meaning, roughly, "military administrator."  The term was used particularly for the Seljuk Turks' representative in Iraq, who exerted the Seljuks' power over the Abbasid caliph.  The Seljuks themselves ruled their empire, which included most of southwest Asia in the 11th century and after, from Iran.

List of shihnas

Baghdad
 Bursuq the Elder (April 1060 – 1061), the first shihna of Baghdad
 Oshin (1061–?), a ghulam
 Aqsunqur al-Bursuqi
 Ilghazi (until 1104)

References

"Shihna." Encyclopedia of Islam  3rd ed.  Leiden: E. J. Brill, 1993.

Islamic terminology
Seljuk dynasty
Government of the Abbasid Caliphate